Walter Dunne (18 December 1879 – 9 June 1964) was an Irish sportsperson. He played hurling with his local club Tubberadora and was a member of the Tipperary senior hurling team between 1898 and 1905.

Honours

Tipperary
All-Ireland Senior Hurling Championship (3): 1898, 1899, 1900
Munster Senior Hurling Championship (3): 1898, 1899, 1900

References

1879 births
1964 deaths
Tubberadora hurlers
Tipperary inter-county hurlers
All-Ireland Senior Hurling Championship winners